Ningol Chakouba or Chakouba or Hiyangei Nini Paanba is a festival, celebrated by the Meitei people in the second lunar day of Hiyangei (October–November) month of Manipuri calendar. The festival is celebrated in the theme of strengthening of the bond of love between married ladies (ningol) and their paternal families.

Significance
This Manipuri festival is celebrated in the entire Manipur region as well as other regions of Manipuri settlement. Though originally celebrated by the Meitei people, now it is celebrated by a number of ethnic groups in Manipur. It is also a reunion of family. Brothers are being blessed by sisters on this special day.

Celebration
The married ladies are invited to their paternal families for a feast (Chakouba) to be had together with their brothers (especially) and other family members. After the feast, they are given gifts by their brothers, father, uncles, or (any other male family members), etc. Women also bring special gift to her family.

See also
 Sajibu Nongma Panba - Manipuri new year
 Yaoshang - Manipuri Holi
 Heikru Hidongba - Manipuri boat racing festival

References

November observances
October observances
Festivals in Manipur